Paratriacanthodes is a genus of spikefishes found in the Indian and Pacific Oceans.

Species
There are currently 3 recognized species in this genus:
 Paratriacanthodes abei J. C. Tyler, 1997
 Paratriacanthodes herrei G. S. Myers, 1934
 Paratriacanthodes retrospinis Fowler, 1934 (Sawspine spikefish)

References

Tetraodontiformes
Marine fish genera
Taxa named by Henry Weed Fowler